Wichita Northwest High School, known locally as Northwest High, is a public secondary school in Wichita, Kansas, United States. It is operated by Wichita USD 259 school district and serves 1,320 students in grades 9 to 12.

History
The school opened in 1978. The first principal, John Gasper, was hired in the Spring of 1977 in order to oversee building construction, develop academic programs, hire staff, and make other preparations necessary to open the $10.4 million facility.
In 2013, Gil Alvarez became principal after 2 years at Northeast Magnet.

Facility
The school building features a commons area, which includes a student activity center, a dining facility, a study area, and an informal social gathering place. The commons area can also be used as a 330-seat theater. Surrounding the central commons are administrative offices, instructional areas, student lockers, and food service. An 800-seat auditorium is also located adjacent to the commons. The physical education complex, located at the terminus of one of the wings (referred to as "halls,") consists of a large multipurpose gymnasium with bleacher seating for 2,900 and a six-lane swimming pool short-course competition swimming pool with retractable bleachers for 400 spectators.

Northwest is receiving multiple updates per a 2008 bond issue, such as: new tennis courts (completed 2010), new astroturf football field (completed 2009), new bleachers, permanent concessions stands and locker rooms in the football stadium, new physical education classroom (previously wrestling room), new wrestling room and weights room (previously north 1/3 of gym), new gymnasium (south of current gym; on current baseball field), as well as a new business department and more classrooms.

Extracurricular activities

Athletics
Wichita Northwest is a member of the Kansas State High School Activities Association (KSHSAA) and competes in the 6A division.  The following sports are offered:

Baseball (boys)
Basketball (boys & girls)
Bowling (boys & girls)
Cheerleading (coed)
Cross country (boys & girls)
Dance (girls)
Football (boys)
Golf (boys & girls)
Soccer (boys & girls)
Softball (girls)
Swimming & diving (boys & girls)
Tennis (boys & girls)
Track (boys & girls)
Volleyball (girls)
Wrestling (boys)

State Championships

Non-athletic activities
Debate
Drama/Theatre
National Honors Society
Explorer (newspaper)
Quill and Scroll
Scholars' Bowl
Silvertip (yearbook)
Student Senate
Band

Notable alumni
 Tony Barker, former NFL player
 Braeden Cloutier, retired professional soccer player, played for various franchises in the Major League Soccer
 Hailey Colborn, Miss Teen USA 2018
 Breece Hall, NFL running back for the New York Jets
 Chris Harper, former NFL player.
 LeBaron Hollimon, retired professional soccer player and coach
 Jeff Richardson, former MLB player
 Phil Stacey, American singer and finalist on American Idol Season 6
 Kamerion Wimbley, former NFL player

See also

 Education in Kansas
 List of high schools in Kansas
 List of unified school districts in Kansas

References

External links
 Official school website
 Excerpts from A History of Wichita Public School Buildings, USD 259. 

Public high schools in Kansas
Schools in Wichita, Kansas
1978 establishments in Kansas
Educational institutions established in 1978